Altzomoni is a volcanic peak located in the State of Mexico. It is located inside Izta-Popo Zoquiapan National Park.

The area is used as a base for those climbing Ixtaccíhuatl. It also is recognizable for its large television tower, used by Televisa for the transmission of analog television to Puebla and Cuernavaca.

The Universidad Nacional Autónoma de México also maintains an atmospheric observatory on the mountain.

Television
Three digital television stations are based on the same tower. While each of them primarily serves Puebla, Cuernavaca and the state of Tlaxcala, they are licensed to Altzomoni:

XEX-TDT (channel 42)
XHTM-TDT (channel 36)
XHATZ-TDT (channel 47)

Each of these stations has digital facilities which are on Televisa's tower in Puebla.

References

Mountains of Mexico
Landforms of the State of Mexico
Landforms of Puebla
Landforms of Morelos
Volcanoes of the State of Mexico